Devotion is an EP by Gnaw Their Tongues, released on March 22, 2008 by At War With False Noise.

Track listing

Personnel
Adapted from the Devotion liner notes.
 Maurice de Jong (as Mories) – vocals, instruments, recording, cover art

Release history

References

External links 
 
 Devotion at Bandcamp

2008 EPs
Gnaw Their Tongues albums